

200001–200100 

|-id=002
| 200002 Hehe ||  || "Hehe" ("harmony") is the name of Suzhou Hehe Culture Foundation. "Hehe" is a traditional Chinese symbol representing good marriage and loving family. || 
|-id=003
| 200003 Aokeda ||  || Aokeda, the Chinese abbreviation for the Macau University of Science and Technology (Ao Men Ke Ji Da Xue) is the largest institution of higher education in Macau, China || 
|-id=020
| 200020 Cadi Ayyad ||  || The Cadi Ayyad University (UCA), one of the most important university in Morocco || 
|-id=025
| 200025 Cloud Gate ||  || Cloud Gate Dance Theater of Taiwan, founded by choreographer Lin Hwai-min, is acclaimed as one of the finest contemporary dance companies in the world for its innovative works inspired by Asian cultures || 
|-id=031
| 200031 Romainmontaigut ||  || Romain Montaigut (born 1989) is a French amateur astronomer and active member of the CALA astronomy club. He is a leader in high-precision photometry, mainly for asteroids studies, and has discovered the binary nature of many asteroids. || 
|-id=033
| 200033 Newtaipei ||  || New Taipei City is located in northern Taiwan and the most populous city of Taiwan. It surrounds the Taipei Basin and includes a substantial stretch of the island's northern coastline. || 
|-id=052
| 200052 Sinigaglia ||  || Gianfranco Sinigaglia (1929–1990), Italian teacher of radioastronomy and applied electronics at the Physics Institute of Bologna University || 
|-id=069
| 200069 Alastor || 4322 P-L || Alastor, a Greek hero, was leader of the Pylian contingent before Troy || 
|}

200101–200200 

|-bgcolor=#f2f2f2
| colspan=4 align=center | 
|}

200201–200300 

|-id=234
| 200234 Kumashiro ||  || Masato Kumashiro (born 1989), a Japanese baseball player for the Saitama Seibu Lions. || 
|-id=255
| 200255 Weigle ||  || Gerald Edwin Weigle II (born 1970) served as the Ralph Instrument Lead Engineer for the New Horizons Mission to Pluto. || 
|}

200301–200400 

|-bgcolor=#f2f2f2
| colspan=4 align=center | 
|}

200401–200500 

|-bgcolor=#f2f2f2
| colspan=4 align=center | 
|}

200501–200600 

|-id=578
| 200578 Yungchuen ||  || Chuen Yung (1936–2014), a medical doctor in Hong Kong. || 
|}

200601–200700 

|-bgcolor=#f2f2f2
| colspan=4 align=center | 
|}

200701–200800 

|-id=750
| 200750 Rix ||  || Hans-Walter Rix (born 1964), a German astrophysicist and director of the Max Planck Institute for Astronomy at Heidelberg who contributed to the Sloan Digital Sky Survey || 
|}

200801–200900 

|-bgcolor=#f2f2f2
| colspan=4 align=center | 
|}

200901–201000 

|-bgcolor=#f2f2f2
| colspan=4 align=center | 
|}

References 

200001-201000